Josias Braun-Blanquet (3 August 1884 – 20 September 1980) was an influential phytosociologist and botanist. Braun-Blanquet was born in Chur, Switzerland and died in Montpellier, France.

Biography

Work
In Josias Braun-Blanquet's dissertation, supervised by Charles Flahault, he worked on the phytosociology of the southern Cévennes. Subsequently he established the modern way of classifying vegetation according to floristic composition. This is what makes him one of the most influential botanists until today.

Braun-Blanquet's way of classifying a plant community uses the scientific name of its most characteristic species as namesake, changing the ending of the generic name to "-etum" and treating the specific epithet as adjective. Thus, a particular type of mesotrophic grassland widespread in western Europe and dominated only by false oat-grass (Arrhenatherum elatius) becomes Arrhenatheretum elatioris Br.-Bl..

To distinguish between similar plant communities dominated by the same species, other important species are included in the name which otherwise is formed according to the same rules. Another type of mesotrophic pastureland – also widespread in western Europe but dominated by black knapweed (Centaurea nigra) and crested dog's-tail (Cynosurus cristatus) – is consequently named Centaureo-Cynosuretum cristati Br.-Bl. & Tx.. 

If the second species is characteristic but notably less dominant than the first one, its genus name may be used as the adjective, for example in Pterocarpetum rhizophorosus, a type of tropical scrubland near water which has abundant Pterocarpus officinalis and significant (though not overwhelmingly prominent) red mangrove (Rhizophora mangle).

Awards
1974: Linnean Medal

Publications
Braun-Blanquet, Josias (1964): Pflanzensoziologie, Grundzüge der Vegetationskunde. (3. Auflage). Springer Verlag, Wien, 865 pages.
 La Végétation alpine des Pyrénées Orientales, étude de phyto-sociologie comparée (Monografías de la Estación de Estudios Pirenaicos y del Instituto Español de Edafología, Ecología y Fisiología Vegetal, 9 (Bot. 1). Consejo Superior de Investigaciones Científicas, Barcelona, 1948).
 Las comunidades vegetales de la depresión del Ebro y su dinamismo, con Oriol de Bolòs (Ayuntamiento de Zaragoza, 1987).

References

1884 births
1980 deaths
Swiss phytogeographers
20th-century Swiss botanists
Academic staff of the University of Montpellier
Members of the Institute for Catalan Studies
People from Chur
Members of the Royal Swedish Academy of Sciences